ATPase WRNIP1 is an enzyme that in humans is encoded by the WRNIP1 gene. The protein is a member of AAA ATPase family.

Werner's syndrome is a rare autosomal recessive disorder characterized by premature aging. The protein encoded by this gene interacts with the N-terminal portion of Werner protein containing the exonuclease domain. This protein shows homology to replication factor C family proteins, and is conserved from E. coli to human. Studies in yeast suggest that this gene may influence the aging process. Two transcript variants encoding different isoforms have been isolated for this gene.

Interactions
WRNIP1 has been shown to interact with Werner syndrome ATP-dependent helicase.

References

Further reading

External links